The Old Metropolis is an early 11th-century Byzantine basilica, dedicated to Saint Paul, that during the Ottoman period of the city became an Ottoman mosque as the Hünkar Mosque (Τζαμί του Χουνκιάρ, meaning "Imperial Mosque" in Turkish), in the northern Greek city of Veria.

History 

Veria fell to the Ottoman Empire in 1430, and the metropolitan cathedral was converted into a mosque named after the Ottoman Sultan (Hünkar means "sovereign, emperor"). The Ottomans made a few alterations to the building, replacing the semi-circular arches of the upper windows to pointed ones, and demolished the northern portion of the transept to add a plain minaret. The external decoration of ancient Greek motifs remained unaltered but survive only in fragments today, but in the interior they covered up the 13th-century frescoes with plaster, damaging them in the process as they drilled holes to make the plaster stick.

Following the capture of the city by the Greek Army during the First Balkan War (October 1912), the mosque was reconsecrated and functioned for a period as a church. It then passed to the local "Apostle Paul" Christian Union, housed government agencies during the World Wars, and was used as a stable during the German occupation of Greece. As late as 2007, the building remained in a half-ruined state, without proper maintenance or restoration work being undertaken. Since October 2010. the building underwent restoration by the 11th Ephorate of Byzantine Antiquities, funded by the EU through the Partnership Agreement for the Development Framework 2007–13, with a budget of 3,465,000 Euro. The work involved extensive interventions to enhance the building's structural stability and preserve the rediscovered frescoes, as well as the elements added during the Ottoman-era use as a mosque.

Following completion of the restoration work, the church will be re-consecrated on 5 June 2016 by the Bishop of Veria, and will be re-opened to the public beginning from 1 July 2016.

Structure 

The building, dating to the early 11th century, is considered one of the largest surviving middle Byzantine buildings in the Balkans, and one of the largest episcopal cathedrals in the region of Macedonia, but its early history is obscure apart from a single inscription on its western entrance that records that it was the work of a certain Niketas, who is attested as the city's bishop in 1078. Opinions differ as to its original consecration, which was believed to be either to Saints Peter and Paul or to the Twelve Apostles, but during restoration work in 2010–16 a fresco depicting the enthroned Theotokos was discovered above the church's main northern gate, indicating that the church was dedicated to her. It is a typical three-aisled basilica and a rudimentary transept. The main aisle is framed by alternating pessaries and columns topped by reused Ionic order capitals. The southern aisle no longer survives, having collapsed at an unknown date.

See also 
 Byzantine Greece
 List of former mosques in Greece

References

Sources 
 

11th-century Eastern Orthodox church buildings
Byzantine church buildings
Buildings and structures in Veria
Basilica churches in Greece
Mosques converted from churches in Ottoman Greece
Former mosques in Greece